Greece competed at the 1964 Winter Olympics in Innsbruck, Austria.  The nation returned to the Winter Games after having missed the 1960 Winter Olympics.

Alpine skiing

Men

Men's slalom

References
Official Olympic Reports
 Olympic Winter Games 1964, full results by sports-reference.com

Nations at the 1964 Winter Olympics
1964
Winter Olympics